Eden National Boarding School (Nepali:ईडेन नेशनल बोर्डिङ स्कुल) is a school located in Biratnagar, Nepal. It was established in 1991 (2048 B.S.) The school's first graduates were in 2000 (2056 B.S.) In 2010 (2066 B.S.), school went under new management.

References

Schools in Nepal
1991 establishments in Nepal